Bhumibol Adulyadej Hospital is a hospital located in Sai Mai District, Bangkok, Thailand. It is a military hospital operated by the Directorate of Medical Services, The Royal Thai Air Force particularly for personnel of the Royal Thai Air Force, but also for the general public. It is a teaching hospital for Royal Thai Air Force Nursing College, Phramongkutklao College of Medicine as well as some clinical year (year 4-6) students of the Faculty of Medicine, Chulalongkorn University, under the agreement between the Faculty of Medicine and the Directorate of Medical Services.

Bhumibol Adulyadej Hospital was served by the BTS Sukhumvit Line at Bhumibol Adulyadej Hospital BTS Station since 16 December 2020.

History 
Bhumibol Adulyadej Hospital was opened on 27 March 1949, named in honour of King Bhumibol Adulyadej. It initially had a capacity of 88 beds, and gradually expanded to have a building for each medical specialty, such as radiology, otorhinolaryngology and including separate internal medicine and surgery buildings for male and female patients.

See also 
Healthcare in Thailand
 Hospitals in Thailand
 List of hospitals in Thailand

References 

 This article incorporates material from the corresponding article in the Thai Wikipedia

Hospitals in Bangkok
Royal Thai Air Force
Military hospitals in Thailand
Sai Mai district